The Nashville Subdivision is a railroad line owned by CSX Transportation in the U.S. state of Tennessee. The line runs from Brentwood, Tennessee, to Columbia, Tennessee, for a total of 30.8 miles. At its north end the line continues south from the Nashville Terminal Subdivision and at its south end it continues south as the Tennessee Southern Railroad.

See also
 List of CSX Transportation lines

References

CSX Transportation lines
Rail infrastructure in Tennessee